Houston Roller Derby (HRD) is a women's flat track roller derby league based in Houston, Texas. HRD was founded in early 2004, and is a founding member league of the Women's Flat Track Derby Association (WFTDA).

History
Originally formed in early 2004 as the Space City Rollergirls, Houston Roller Derby split from their founding group in the pursuit of an all-skater owned league, after the founding members of Space City attempted to fire the league's coed training team. The new league focused on democratic leadership, with decisions made by committees with elected leaders. HRD's first bout took place in October 2005 at the Pasadena Convention Center, and by this time the league had about 60 members and consisted of four teams: The Bayou City Bosses, The Burlesque Brawlers, The Machete Betties and The Psych Ward Sirens. 2006 bouts took place at the Arabia Shrine Temple. The 2007 and 2008 season bouts took place at the Verizon Wireless Theater, with additional games held at Jopa Sports in Shenandoah. The 2009 and 2010 bouts took place at Kick's Indoor, and the 2011 bouts took place at Houston Indoor Sports. Houston Roller Derby filed as a public charity (Houston Rollergirls Inc. dba Houston Roller Derby) and received its tax-deductible 501(c)(3) non-profit status effective March 11, 2011. HRD's season bouts from the 2012 season forward take place in downtown Houston at Bayou Music Center (formerly the Verizon Wireless Theater).

Teams
Houston Roller Derby consists of four home teams that play within the league as well as against visiting teams from other WFTDA leagues. Houston Roller Derby also has an all-star travel team, formerly called HaRD Knocks but now referred to as the all-stars, which was formed in 2006 to play against other WFTDA leagues across the U.S. and in WFTDA tournaments and competitions. The HRD all-stars were one of twelve WFTDA teams who qualified to compete in the WFTDA Championships in Philadelphia, Pennsylvania, in 2009. League skater Windigo played for Team Canada at the 2011 Roller Derby World Cup.

Houston Roller Derby formed the travel team in 2006 to play against other WFTDA leagues across the country and in tournaments and competitions. The team's first interleague competition was the Dust Devil National Flat Track Derby Tournament held in February 2006. The Texas Rollergirls from Austin won the 20-team tournament held in Tucson, Arizona; HRD placed 13th.

WFTDA competition
Houston Roller Derby competed at the first WFTDA Championships, the "Dust Devil" tournament, in 2006, where they finished in 13th place. Houston next competed at WFTDA Playoffs in 2008 as the 11th seed at that year's WFTDA Western Regional Tournament and finished in ninth place. Ahead of the 2009 season, the WFTDA adjusted its structure, and Houston was placed in the South Central Region. At that year's WFTDA South Central Regional Tournament, Houston was the third seed and finished in third place with a 113–101 victory over the Dallas Derby Devils to qualify for Championships. At Championships, Houston was eliminated by a 239–46 loss to Rocky Mountain Rollergirls in the opening round. In 2010, Houston was the seventh seed at the South Central Regional, and finished in seventh place by defeating Dallas 150–69. As the fifth seed at the 2011 South Central Playoff, Houston again finished in the seeded position at fifth, with a 173–157 victory over No Coast Derby Girls. At the final South Central Regional in 2012, Houston was the third seed but went 1-2 and finished in ninth place by beating Jacksonville RollerGirls 255–155.

In 2013 the WFTDA restructured playoffs again, and under the new divisional model Houston qualified as a Division 1 team as the seventh seed for the tournament in Asheville, North Carolina, and finished in sixth place after a 202–185 loss to Steel City Derby Demons. Houston was the ninth seed at the 2014 Evansville Division 1 tournament, but lost their three games to finish in tenth. In 2015, Houston competed as the third seed at the Division 2 Playoff in Cleveland, and finished in fourth place, losing their final game to Santa Cruz Derby Girls 154–141. Houston returned to Division 2 in 2016 at Wichita as the second seed, but ultimately finished in sixth place, ending their weekend with a 184–181 loss to the Boulder County Bombers. In 2017 Houston returned to Division 1 Playoffs as the eleventh seed in Dallas, but lost to Queen City Roller Girls 195-104 and to Atlanta Rollergirls 323–143 to finish out of the medal round. In 2018 Houston received an invitation to a WFTDA Continental Cup, but declined their invitation.

Rankings

 CR = consolation round
 DNP = did not play

Partial WFTDA sanctioned results

In media
In 2009, members of Houston Roller Derby were featured in Hard Knocks: Rolling with the Derby Girls, a photo collection book by Houston photographer Shelley Canton.

References

External links
 Houston Roller Derby Official Website
 Women's Flat Track Derby Association Official Website

Non-profit organizations based in Texas
Roller derby leagues in Texas
Roller derby leagues established in 2005
Sports in Houston
Women's Flat Track Derby Association Division 1
2005 establishments in Texas